Seyed Ali Kiaei (born 20 April 1987) is an Iranian professional futsal coach and former player.  He is currently assistant coach of Moghavemat Alborz in the Iranian Futsal Super League.

Honours

Country 
 Asian Indoor and Martial Arts Games
 Champions (3): 2007, 2009 - 2013

Club 
 AFC Futsal Club Championship
 Runners-up (1): 2011 (Shahid Mansouri)
 Iranian Futsal Super League
 Champions (2): 2010–11 (Shahid Mansouri) - 2011–12 (Shahid Mansouri)

References

External links 
 
 

1987 births
Living people
People from Karaj
Iranian men's futsal players
Futsal forwards
Persepolis FSC players
Shensa Saveh FSC players
Shahid Mansouri FSC players
Shahrvand Sari FSC players
Shahrdari Saveh FSC players
Iranian expatriate futsal players
Iranian futsal coaches
21st-century Iranian people